This is a list of Maltese football transfers for the 2014–15 summer transfer window by club. Only transfers of clubs in the Maltese Premier League and Maltese First Division are included.

The summer transfer window opened on 1 July 2014, although a few transfers may take place prior to that date. The window closed at midnight on 31 August 2014. Players without a club may join one at any time, either during or in between transfer windows.

Maltese Premier League

Balzan
Manager:  Oliver Spiteri

In:

 
 

Out:

Birkirkara
Manager:  Paul Zammit

In:

 
 
 
 

Out:

Floriana
Manager:  Giovanni Tedesco

In:

 
 
 

Out:

Hibernians
Manager:  Branko Nisevic

In:

 

Out:

Mosta
Manager:  Enrico Piccioni

In:

 
 
 

Out:

Naxxar Lions

In:

Out:

Qormi
Manager:  Josef Mansueto

In:

 

Out:

Pietà Hotspurs

In:

Out:

Sliema Wanderers

In:

 

Out:

Tarxien Rainbows
Manager:  Clive Mizzi

In:

 
 
 
 

Out:

Valletta
Manager:  Gilbert Agius

In:

  
 
 
 

Out:

Zebbug Rangers

In:

 
 
 

Out:

Maltese First Division

Birzebbuga St.Peters

In:

Out:

Fgura United

In:

Out:

Gudja United
Manager:  Alan Mifsud

In:

 

Out:

Gżira United

In:

Out:

Lija Athletic
Manager:  Joe Brincat

In:

Out:

Melita
Manager:  Neil Zarb Cousin

In:

Out:

Msida Saint-Joseph

In:

Out:

Mqabba

In:

Out:

Pembroke Athleta
Manager:  Jacques Scerri

In:

 
 
 
 
 
 

Out:

Rabat Ajax

In:

Out:

St. Andrews

In:

Out:

St. George's

In:

Out:

Vittoriosa Stars

In:

 
 

Out:

Żurrieq

In:

Out:

See also
 List of Bulgarian football transfers summer 2014
 List of Dutch football transfers summer 2014
 List of English football transfers summer 2014
 List of French football transfers summer 2014
 List of German football transfers summer 2014
 List of Italian football transfers summer 2014
 List of Portuguese football transfers summer 2014
 List of Spanish football transfers summer 2014

References

External links
 Official Website

Maltese
Transfers
Transfers
2014